Methylammonium bromide in an organic halide with a formula of CH3NH3Br. It is the salt of methylammonium and bromide. It is a colorless, water-soluble solid.

The methylammonium halides are precursors to perovskite solar cells, which are being evaluated.

References 

Methylammonium compounds
Bromides